Who's Last is the second live album by British rock band The Who, recorded in 1982 during what was then billed as the band's "farewell tour". Thus, this album, released in 1984, was to be the band's last album.

Most of the album was taken from the band's 14 December 1982 show at Richfield Coliseum in Cleveland, Ohio, which was their "last concert in the USA" (as Pete Townshend can be heard saying after "Won't Get Fooled Again") this time around. Four songs come from different sources (verified by meticulous comparison with soundboard and audience recordings and videos from that tour). "Behind Blue Eyes" is from the 10 October show at Brendan Byrne Arena in East Rutherford; "Magic Bus" and "Summertime Blues" are from the 20 October show at the Kingdome in Seattle; and "Substitute" is from the 27 October show at Jack Murphy Stadium in San Diego.

Notable by their absence from this recording, released by MCA two years after the tour, are songs from the band's two then recent Warner Bros. Records albums, Face Dances and It's Hard, although they played "The Quiet One" (from Face Dances) and several songs from It's Hard every night on the tour.

Five songs from this tour were released as bonus tracks to the 1997 editions of Face Dances ("The Quiet One" from the Shea Stadium on 13 October 1982), and It's Hard ("It's Hard," "Eminence Front," "Dangerous" and "Cry If You Want" from Toronto on 17 December 1982, the first three of which were later included on the 2007 release Live from Toronto. While that album is from the same tour, it does not contain any of the performances on Who's Last.

Critical reception

Reviewing for AllMusic, critic Stephen Thomas Erlewine wrote of the album "it's a damn long way from Live at Leeds to Who's Last, and the distance between the two extremes is nothing short of stunning. Who's Last is so lifeless and lackluster that it's hard to believe the same band released both records. It may not be a graceful way to end the Who's career, but it's hard to imagine a better testament to why it was time for the band to come to an end."

Track listing
All songs written by Pete Townshend, except where noted.

Personnel
The Who
Roger Daltrey – vocals, rhythm guitar, harmonica
Pete Townshend – lead guitar, vocals
John Entwistle – bass guitar, vocals
Kenney Jones – drums

Additional musicians
Tim Gorman – piano, keyboards, synthesizer, backing vocals

Production
Dave "Cyrano" Langston – production, engineer, mixing
Bill Smith – cover design
Gavin Cochrane – photography
Neal Preston – photography

Charts

Certifications

References

The Who live albums
1984 live albums
MCA Records live albums